The Liberty Hill Foundation is a non-profit organization founded by Sarah Pillsbury, heir to the Minnesota Pillsbury baking fortune, along with Anne Mendel, Larry Janss and Win McCormack, in 1976. Its motto is "Change. Not Charity."

The name of the foundation derives from a famous incident on May 15, 1923 when writer Upton Sinclair spoke to approximately 3,000 striking longshoremen at Liberty Hill in San Pedro, Los Angeles, California. In a piece of street theater designed to highlight ongoing suppression of freedom of speech by the LAPD, Sinclair began his address by reading the Bill of Rights. Within moments, he was arrested.

Activities 
The foundation has funded local Los Angeles organizations dedicated to environmental justice, such as East Yard Communities for Environmental Justice. It has also provided funding for out-of-state organizations such as the Brennan Center for Justice at New York University School of Law.

References

External links

Organizations based in Los Angeles
Non-profit organizations based in California